Farma 3 — Bude to divočina (English: The Farm 3) is the Slovak version of The Farm reality television show based on the Swedish television series of the same name. The show filmed in August–November 2012 and premiered on September 7, 2012 on Markíza.

Format
Eighteen contestants are cut out from outside world. Each week one contestant is selected the Farmer of the Week. In the first week, the contestants choose the Farmer. Since week 2, the Farmer is chosen by the contestant evicted in the previous week.

Nomination Process
The Farmer of the Week nominates two people (a man and a woman) as the Butlers. The others must decide, which Butler is the first to go to the Battle. That person than choose the second person (from the same sex) for the Battle and also the type of battle (a quiz, extrusion, endurance, sleight). The Battle winner must win two duels. The Battle loser is evicted from the game.  In the live final 16 December 2012 Mário Drobný won 50 000 € . Silvia Haluzová finish on the second place. Mário Drobný won title Favorit Farmer.

Contestants 
Ages stated are at time of contest.

Nominations

The game

External links
http://farma.markiza.sk
 Farma 3 Markíza 

The Farm (franchise)
2012 Slovak television seasons